Moin-ul-Atiq (born August 5, 1964 in Karachi, Sindh) is a Pakistani former cricketer who played five ODIs between 1988 and 1989.

First Pakistani international cricketer who received a degree in Sports Management from University of Central Lanchashire UK, Also Done MBA in Marketing from Hims, working as Sports Director at DHA SUFFA UNIVERSITY KARACHI.

International awards

One-Day International Cricket

Man of the Match awards

References 

1964 births
Living people
Pakistan One Day International cricketers
Habib Bank Limited cricketers
United Bank Limited cricketers
Pakistani cricketers
Karachi cricketers
Karachi Whites cricketers
Karachi Blues cricketers
Peshawar cricketers
Cricketers from Karachi